Angélica Liddell (born Angélica González in 1966) is a Spanish writer, theatre director and actor.

Biography
Angélica González was born in Figueres, Catalonia, and went on to study psychology and dramatic arts. Liddell began writing plays during the 1980s. In 1993, she founded the theatre company Atra Bilis Teatro.

Her works have been performed in Spain, Germany, Brazil, France and Chile; her work been translated into French, English, Portuguese, German, Polish and Russian. Besides plays for theatre, she writes poetry and prose.

Awards and honours
 the Casa de América Innovative Playwriting Award in 2003
 second prize for the Lope de Vega Award in 2007
 the Silver Lion at the Venice Biennale in 2013

Selected plays 
 La falsa suicida (2000)
 Once upon a time in West Asphixia (2002)
 Y cómo no se pudrió Blancanieves (2005)
 Perro muerto en tintorería: los Fuertes (2007)
 Ping Pang Qiu (2013)
 Alice Syndrome (2013)
 ¿Qué haré yo con esta espada? (2016)
 Esta breve tragedia de la carne (This Brief Tragedy of the Flesh), 2018. Alexander Kasser Theater (New Jersey, NJ)

References

External links 
 

1966 births
Living people
Writers from Catalonia
Catalan dramatists and playwrights
Actresses from Catalonia